The 1931 Portsmouth Spartans season was their second in the league. The team improved on their previous season's output of 5–6–3, winning eleven games. They finished second in the league.

Schedule

Standings

References

External links 
1931 Portsmouth Spartans at Pro Football Reference
1931 Portsmouth Spartans at jt-sw.com
1931 Portsmouth Spatans at The Football Database

Detroit Lions seasons
Portsmouth Spartans
Portsmouth Spartans